Fulmor (also known as Fulmor Heights) is an unincorporated community in Upper Moreland Township in Montgomery County, Pennsylvania, United States. Fulmor is located at the intersection of Byberry Road and Warminster Road east of Hatboro. Fulmor uses the Hatboro ZIP code of 19040. The Fulmor Heights residential neighborhood is 59.74 acres and is governed by a housing cooperative known as the Fulmor Heights Home Ownership Association. The neighborhood contains a deli, beauty salon, social club, and gathering hall.

The land on which Fulmor Heights was built was bought in 1940 by the Public Housing Authority, who intended to build housing for civilian defense workers who worked in nearby factories. In 1947, 300 residents bought the neighborhood from the government and organized the housing cooperative.

The community was formerly served by the Fulmor station along SEPTA Regional Rail's Warminster Line, which closed in 1996. The nearest train station to Fulmor is the Hatboro station on the Warminster Line.

References

Unincorporated communities in Montgomery County, Pennsylvania
Unincorporated communities in Pennsylvania
Housing cooperatives in the United States